Anthene chirinda, the Chirinda hairtail, is a butterfly in the family Lycaenidae. It is found in Tanzania, Malawi and Zimbabwe.

References

Butterflies described in 1910
Anthene